Boztahta (literally "gray wood" or "blemished wood" or "spoilt wood" in Turkish) may refer to the following places in Turkey:

 Boztahta, Aladağ, a village in the district of Aladağ, Adana Province
 Boztahta, Karaisalı, a village in the district of Karaisalı, Adana Province
 Boztahta, Kozan, a village in the district of Kozan, Adana Province